Yohann Georges Thuram-Ulien (born 31 October 1988) is a Guadeloupean professional footballer who plays as a goalkeeper for  club Quevilly-Rouen.

Club career
Although Thuram-Ulien was born in Courcouronnes, France, he spent most of his childhood in Guadeloupe. He arrived at Monaco in 2003. He was a part of Monaco's 2007–08 CFA squad that won the reserve's professional title. During the summer of 2008, he signed his first professional contract, keeping him with Monaco until 2011. He was given squad number 1 and designated as third keeper.

He unexpectedly made his professional debut on 29 November 2008 in a 1–0 victory over Auxerre coming on as a substitute in the 37th minute for the injured Flavio Roma who was starting in place of the injured first-choice keeper Stéphane Ruffier. Thuram kept a clean sheet for the rest of the match. Due to the severity of Roma's injury and Ruffier being out indefinitely as well, Yohann started the following week against Sochaux. Yohann performed well enough for Monaco to earn a 1–1 draw. Before signing his professional contract with Monaco, Barcelona showed interest in the young keeper. On 26 June 2010, Thuram signed a contract extension with Monaco until 2012. Four days later, he was loaned to second division club Tours in order to get some consistent playing time. In the summer of 2013, he signed a contract with Standard Liège.

On 13 January 2014, Thuram-Ulien joined English club Charlton Athletic on loan until the end of the season; he made four first-team appearances and kept one clean sheet. According to an article in the Evening Standard, manager Chris Powell was ordered to play Thuram-Ulien over Ben Hamer by the club's owner Roland Duchâtelet.

On 2 August 2016, Thuram signed a three-year contract for French club Le Havre. He signed for Le Mans, newly promoted to Ligue 2, in July 2019.

On 17 July 2020, Amiens announced the signing of Thuram-Ulien on a two-year deal.

On 2 August 2022, Thuram signed with Quevilly-Rouen for one year.

International career
Thuram-Ulien did not receive any distinct call-ups to any of the youth national squads, but has received call-ups to France's under-21 futsal team. On 5 February 2009, he earned his first call-up to the France under-21 team. On 24 March 2009, he was called up to the Guadeloupe national team for a friendly match. His call up to Guadeloupe, who were preparing for the 2009 CONCACAF Gold Cup, would not have hindered future selections from France for Thuram as they are not a member of FIFA. He made his debut for the Guadeloupean national team in a Caribbean Cup 0–0 (3–2) win on penalties against Suriname.

Personal life
Thuram-Ulien was born in France to parents of Guadeloupean descent. He is the cousin of former French international defender and 1998 World Cup winner Lilian Thuram, who also began his senior career at Monaco.

References

External links
 
 

Living people
1988 births
Association football goalkeepers
Guadeloupean footballers
Guadeloupe international footballers
French footballers
AS Monaco FC players
Tours FC players
Standard Liège players
Charlton Athletic F.C. players
Le Havre AC players
Le Mans FC players
Amiens SC players
US Quevilly-Rouen Métropole players
Ligue 1 players
Ligue 2 players
Belgian Pro League players
English Football League players
French expatriate footballers
Expatriate footballers in Belgium
French expatriate sportspeople in Belgium
French people of Guadeloupean descent
2021 CONCACAF Gold Cup players
Thuram family